Anna Ǻsa Olivia Westerlund (born 9 April 1989) is a Finnish footballer, who plays at club level for Åland United. She previously played for FC Honka in Finland's Naisten Liiga and Umeå IK. Despite playing 90 minutes in all 22 of Umeå's league matches, her contract with the club was not extended at the end of the 2011 season. The following season she remained in Sweden with Piteå IF.

International career
Westerlund was part of the Finland squad at the 2006 FIFA U-20 Women's World Championship. Her senior Finland women's national football team debut came in January 2008, against China.

By the time of UEFA Women's Euro 2009, hosted by Finland, Westerlund was established in the squad. She played in three matches, including the 3–2 quarter-final defeat by England.

In June 2013 Westerlund was named in national coach Andrée Jeglertz's Finland squad for UEFA Women's Euro 2013. Typically a defensive midfielder with her club team, Westerlund was used as a centre back by Finland. She required a stitch in a head wound during Finland's opening match, a 0–0 draw with Italy.

International goals

References

External links

 
 Player's profile at Football Association of Finland 

1989 births
Living people
Finnish women's footballers
Finnish expatriate footballers
Finnish expatriate sportspeople in Sweden
Finnish expatriate sportspeople in Norway
Expatriate women's footballers in Sweden
Expatriate women's footballers in Norway
Toppserien players
Swedish-speaking Finns
Damallsvenskan players
Finland women's international footballers
Umeå IK players
Piteå IF (women) players
FC Honka (women) players
Kansallinen Liiga players
LSK Kvinner FK players
FIFA Century Club
Women's association football central defenders
Women's association football midfielders
People from Pargas
Sportspeople from Southwest Finland
UEFA Women's Euro 2022 players